The 1958 Nevada gubernatorial election was held on November 4, 1958. Incumbent Republican Charles H. Russell ran unsuccessfully for re-election to a third term as Governor of Nevada. He was defeated by Democratic nominee Grant Sawyer with 59.92% of the vote.

Primary elections
Primary elections were held on September 2, 1958.

Democratic primary

Candidates
Grant Sawyer, Elko County District Attorney
Harvey Dickerson, Nevada Attorney General
George E. Franklin Jr.
William Richard Pate

Results

General election

Candidates
Grant Sawyer, Democratic
Charles H. Russell, Republican

Results

References

1958
Nevada
Gubernatorial
November 1958 events in the United States